Odontoglossum cruentum, the blood-red odontoglossum, is a species of orchid found from Ecuador to Peru.

cruentum